Rubus weatherbyi is a rare North American species of flowering plants in the rose family. It is found only in eastern Canada in the Provinces of New Brunswick and Nova Scotia.

The genetics of Rubus is extremely complex, so that it is difficult to decide on which groups should be recognized as species. There are many rare species with limited ranges such as this. Further study is suggested to clarify the taxonomy.

References

weatherbyi
Plants described in 1943
Flora of Nova Scotia
Flora of New Brunswick
Flora without expected TNC conservation status